Ključ may refer to:

 Ključ, Una-Sana Canton, a town in Bosnia and Herzegovina
 Ključ (Gacko), a village in Bosnia and Herzegovina
 Ključ (Mionica), a village in Serbia
 Ključ, Varaždin County, a village near Novi Marof, Croatia
 Ključ, Šibenik-Knin County, a village near Drniš, Croatia
 Ključ (Belgrade), a hamlet of Bečmen, Serbia
 Ključ, Mionica, a village in Serbia
 Ključ (film), a 1965 Croatian film
 Ključ (talk show), a TV program
 Ključ Brdovečki, a village near Brdovec, Croatia
 Klyuch, the village in Bulgaria also transliterated as Ključ